Tropinota squalida is a species of beetle belonging to the family Scarabaeidae, subfamily Cetoniinae.

These beetles are mainly found in France, Italy, Greece, North Macedonia, Portugal, former Yugoslavia, Spain, in the Near East and in North Africa.

Larvae feed on roots, while the adults can be encountered from May through July feeding on flowers.

Head, scutellum and elytra are dark-brown, with a thick and long tawny hair on elytra and abdomen. Elytra show two series of white spots on the sides of the central hull. Scutellun is rounded and hairy, but glabrous in the posterior. The fifth humeral slot is bifurcated.

Subspecies
 Tropinota squalida canariensis Lindberg, 1950
 Tropinota squalida squalida (Scopoli, 1783)
 Tropinota squalida pilosa Brullé, 1832

External links
 Biolib
 Fauna Europaea

Cetoniinae
Beetles of Europe
Beetles described in 1783